In statistics, bucket evaluations is a method for correlating vectors. This method is a non-parametric, unsupervised correlation method first published in 2012 by Shabtai et al.

Bucket evaluations was initially constructed for genetic research, and was used for finding a new potential anti-cancer drug.

Bucket evaluations is named after the technique used to compare vectors in a matrix. Values in the vector are compared in sections (buckets). The buckets are set in a descending order, where the smallest buckets hold the highest scores, and have the strongest effect on the final correlation score. The similarity between vectors is calculated by comparing the ranks of the scores in each bucket, which are summed up to a similarity score.

References 

Covariance and correlation